Maria Nicole Jeremiah Dulalia (born October 20, 1997) is a Filipino television actress. She entered showbiz when she was chosen to play the role of Sha-sha in the telefantasya, Super Twins. She played Lev in GMA Network's telenovela, Alice Bungisngis and her Wonder Walis which concluded in June 2012. She has since played supporting roles in a range of television series of GMA, including Villa Quintana (2013-2014) as Maricel Mangaron, Niño (2014) as Patty, Strawberry Lane as Chloe Bermudez and Once Upon a Kiss (2015) as Margaux.

TV appearances

References

Living people
Filipino television actresses
1997 births
Filipino child actresses
GMA Network personalities